Salvatore Grimaldi (born 25 May 1945) is a Swedish entrepreneur and speaker. He is the chairman of Företagarna and the CEO of Grimaldi Industri AB.

Early life
Salvatore Grimaldi was born in Taranto, Italy. He migrated from Italy to Västerås, Sweden with his parents in the early 1950s. His mother came to Sweden to visit her brothers, who had found work at a company called ASEA. She found Sweden to be such a beautiful country that she decided to stay.

Career
After working at Volvo, Grimaldi founded a grind mill in his own garage in Köping in 1970. In 1982, he started acquiring companies, including Bianchi, Monark, Crescent and Stiga. He then restructured these companies and sold off portions of the companies that did not contribute to his business objectives. Grimaldi ultimately acquired substantial wealth from these transactions.

Personal life

In 2001, Grimaldi received attention from local media when he bought Villa Geber in Diplomatstaden, Stockholm for around 70 million (SEK). At the time, Villa Geber was one of the most expensive private homes in Sweden. On July 1, 2002, he presented an episode of the Sveriges Radio show Sommar i P1. Grimaldi was the chairman of Sweden's largest business owners organisation Företagarna between 2004 and 2006. He is also the chairman of Italienska Handelskammaren, Accademia Italiana della Cucina, Direct Försäkringsmäklarna Västerås. In 2004, Grimaldi was awarded an Honorary Doctorate at Mälardalens College. In 1988, he was awarded the Royal Patriotic Society's Business Medal for his entrepreneurship and his work contributing to important progress of Swedish businesses. In 2011, Network Europe named Grimaldi "[t]he richest immigrant in Sweden", noting that his assets were valued at 1.6 billion Swedish kronor.

References

External links 

Swedish company founders
1945 births
Living people
People from Taranto
People from Västerås
Italian emigrants to Sweden
20th-century Swedish businesspeople
21st-century Swedish businesspeople